Saftleven is a surname. Notable people with the surname include:

Cornelis Saftleven ( 1607–1681), Dutch painter
Herman Saftleven (1609–1685), Dutch painter
Sara Saftleven (1645–1702), Dutch Golden Age flower painter

Dutch-language surnames